Howard University is a private, federally chartered historically black research university in Washington, D.C. It is classified among "R2: Doctoral Universities – High research activity" and accredited by the Middle States Commission on Higher Education.

Tracing its history to 1867, from its outset Howard has been nonsectarian and open to people of all sexes and races. It offers undergraduate, graduate and professional degrees in more than 120 programs, more than any other historically black college or university (HBCU) in the nation.

History

19th century
Shortly after the end of the American Civil War, members of the First Congregational Society of Washington considered establishing a theological seminary for the education of black clergymen. Within a few weeks, the project expanded to include a provision for establishing a university. Within two years, the university consisted of the colleges of liberal arts and medicine. The new institution was named for General Oliver Otis Howard, a Civil War hero who was both the founder of the university and, at the time, commissioner of the Freedmen's Bureau. Howard later served as president of the university from 1869 to 1874.

The U.S. Congress chartered Howard on March 2, 1867 and much of its early funding came from endowment, private benefaction and tuition. (In the 20th and 21st centuries, an annual congressional appropriation, administered by the U.S. Department of Education, funds Howard University and Howard University Hospital.) In its first five years of operation, Howard University educated over 150,000 freed slaves.

Many improvements were made on campus. Howard Hall was renovated and made a dormitory for women.

20th century
In 1912, during his historic journey to the west, Bahá’í Faith leader ‘Abdu’l‑Bahá addressed an integrated gathering in Rankin Chapel at Howard University in which he declared the oneness of all people, the elimination of racial prejudice and segregation and the urgent need for race amity.

From 1926 to 1960, preacher Mordecai Wyatt Johnson was Howard University's first African-American president.

The Great Depression years of the 1930s brought hardship to campus. Despite appeals from Eleanor Roosevelt, Howard saw its budget cut below Hoover administration levels during the presidency of Franklin D. Roosevelt.

In the 1930s, Howard University still had segregated student housing.

Howard University played an important role in the Civil Rights Movement on a number of occasions. The Bahá’í and philosopher Alain Locke, chair of the Department of Philosophy and first African American Rhodes Scholar, authored The New Negro, which helped to usher in the Harlem Renaissance. Ralph Bunche, the first Nobel Peace Prize winner of African descent, served as chair of the Department of Political Science. Beginning in 1942, Howard University students pioneered the "stool-sitting" technique of occupying stools at a local cafeteria which denied service to African Americans, blocking other customers waiting for service. This tactic was to play a prominent role in the later Civil Rights Movement. By January 1943, students had begun to organize regular sit-ins and pickets around Washington, D.C. at cigar stores and cafeterias which refused to serve them because of their race. These protests continued until the fall of 1944.

Stokely Carmichael, also known as Kwame Toure, a student in the Department of Philosophy and the Howard University School of Divinity, coined the term "Black Power" and worked in Lowndes County, Alabama as a voting rights activist. Historian Rayford Logan served as chair of the Department of History. E. Franklin Frazier served as chair of the Department of Sociology. Sterling Allen Brown served as chair of the Department of English.

The first sitting president to speak at Howard was Calvin Coolidge in 1924. His graduation speech was entitled, "The Progress of a People", and highlighted the accomplishments to date of African-Americans since the Civil War. His concluding thought was, "We can not go out from this place and occasion without refreshment of faith and renewal of confidence that in every exigency our Negro fellow citizens will render the best and fullest measure of service whereof they are capable."

In 1965, President Lyndon B. Johnson delivered a speech to the graduating class at Howard, where he outlined his plans for civil rights legislation and endorsed aggressive affirmative action to combat the effects of years of segregation of blacks from the nation's economic opportunities. At the time, the voting rights bill was still pending in the House of Representatives.

In 1975, the historic Freedman's Hospital closed after 112 years of use as Howard University College of Medicine's primary teaching hospital. Howard University Hospital opened that same year and continues to be used as HUCM's primary teaching hospital, with service to the surrounding community.

Also in 1975, Jeanne Sinkford became the first female dean of any American dental school when she was appointed as the dean of Howard University's school of dentistry.

In 1989, Howard gained national attention when students rose up in protest against the appointment of then-Republican National Committee Chairman Lee Atwater as a new member of the university's board of trustees. Student activists disrupted Howard's 122nd-anniversary celebrations, and eventually occupied the university's administration building. Within days, both Atwater and Howard's President, James E. Cheek, resigned.

21st century
In April 2007, the head of the faculty senate called for the ouster of Howard University President H. Patrick Swygert, saying the school was in a state of crisis, and it was time to end "an intolerable condition of incompetence and dysfunction at the highest level." This came on the heels of several criticisms of Howard University and its management. The following month, Swygert announced he would retire in June 2008. The university announced in May 2008 that Sidney Ribeau of Bowling Green State University would succeed Swygert as president. Ribeau appointed a Presidential Commission on Academic Renewal to conduct a year-long self-evaluation that resulted in reducing or closing 20 out of 171 academic programs. For example, they proposed closing the undergraduate philosophy major and African studies major.

Six years later, in 2013, university insiders again alleged the university was in crisis. In April, the vice chairwoman of the university's board of trustees wrote a letter to her colleagues harshly criticizing the university's president and calling for a vote of no confidence; her letter was subsequently obtained by the media where it drew national headline. Two months later, the university's Council of Deans alleged "fiscal mismanagement is doing irreparable harm," blaming the university's senior vice president for administration, chief financial officer and treasurer and asking for his dismissal. In October, the faculty voted no confidence in the university's board of trustees executive committee, two weeks after university president Sidney A. Ribeau announced he would retire at the end of the year. On October 1, the Board of Trustees named Wayne A. I. Frederick Interim President. In July 2014 Howard's Board of Trustees named Frederick as the school's 17th president.

In May 2016, President Barack Obama delivered a commencement address at Howard University encouraging the graduates to become advocates for racial change and to prepare for future challenges.

In 2018, nearly 1,000 students held a sit-in demanding injunction over the administration's use of funding. After the student protest ended, faculty voted "no confidence" in the university president, chief operating officer, provost, and board of trustees.  The nine-day protest ended with university officials promising to meet most of their demands.

In July 2020, philanthropist MacKenzie Scott donated $40 million to Howard.  Her single donation is the largest in Howard's history and one of the largest ever to an HBCU.

In May 2021, the university announced that the newly re-established college of fine arts, led by Dean Phylicia Rashad, would be named the Chadwick A. Boseman College of Fine Arts for the actor and distinguished alum who from his days as a student in the late 1990s through his death from cancer in 2020 led protests against the 1997 absorption of the College of Fine Arts into the College of Arts & Sciences.

In October 2021, a group of students protested the mold, mice, and substandard conditions in campus residential buildings in the Blackburn Takeover, demanding an improvement in the living situation and representation on the board of trustees.

In March 2022, Howard University announced that it will spend $785 million over the next four years to construct new STEM complex, academic buildings to house the Chadwick Boseman School of Fine Arts, and the Cathy Hughes School of Communications, as well as renovate other buildings on campus.

In 2023, Howard University was selected by the Department of the Air Force to lead a research center on tactical autonomy technology for military systems.

Campus

The  campus, often referred to as "The Mecca", is in northwest Washington, D. C.
Major improvements, additions and changes occurred at the school in the aftermath of World War I. New buildings were built under the direction of architect Albert Cassell.

Howard University has several historic landmarks on campus, such as Andrew Rankin Memorial Chapel, Frederick Douglass Memorial Hall, and the Founders Library.

The Howard University Gallery of Art was established by Howard's Board of Trustees in 1928. The gallery's permanent collection has grown to over 4,000 works of art and continues to serve as an academic resource for the Howard community.

Howard University has eight residence halls for students: Drew Hall (male freshmen), College Hall North (female freshmen), The Harriet Tubman Quadrangle - "Quad" (female freshmen), Cook Hall (male freshmen), Bethune Annex (co-ed, undergraduates), Plaza Towers West (co-ed, undergraduates), College Hall South (co-ed, undergraduates) and Plaza Towers East (co-ed, undergraduates).

Howard University Hospital, opened in 1975 on the eastern end of campus, was built on the site of Griffith Stadium, in use from the 1890s to 1965 as home of the first, second and third incarnations of the MLB Senators, as well as the NFL's Washington Redskins, several college football teams (including Georgetown, GWU and Maryland) and part-time home of the Homestead Grays of the Negro National League.

Howard University is home to the commercial radio station WHUR-FM 96.3, also known as Howard University Radio. A student-run station, WHBC, operates on an HD Radio subcarrier for WHUR-FM. Howard is also home to the public television station WHUT-TV, which is on campus next to WHUR-FM.

Organization
The university is led by a Board of Trustees that includes a faculty trustee from the undergraduate colleges, a faculty trustee from the graduate and professional colleges serving three-year terms, two student trustees, each serving one-year terms, and three alumni-elected trustees, each serving three-year terms.

Academics

Schools and colleges

 College of Engineering and Architecture
 College of Nursing & Allied Health Sciences
 College of Pharmacy
 College of Arts and Sciences
 Chadwick Boseman College of Fine Arts
 Howard University College of Dentistry
 Howard University School of Business
 Cathy Hughes School of Communications
 Howard University College of Medicine
 Howard University School of Law
 Middle School of Mathematics and Science
 School of Divinity
 School of Education
 School of Social Work

Faculty
Howard faculty include: member of Congress from Maryland Roscoe Bartlett, blood banking pioneer Charles Drew, Emmy-winning actor Al Freeman Jr., suffragist Elizabeth Piper Ensley, civil rights lawyer Charles Hamilton Houston, media entrepreneur Cathy Hughes, marine biologist Ernest Everett Just, professor of surgery LaSalle D. Leffall Jr., journalists Nikole Hannah-Jones and Ta-Nehisi Coates, political consultant Ron Walters, novelist and diplomat E. R. Braithwaite, filmmaker Haile Gerima, and psychiatrist Frances Cress Welsing.

Honors programs
Howard offers four selective honors programs for its most high-achieving undergraduate students: the College of Arts & Sciences Honors Program, the School of Education Honors Program, the Executive Leadership Honors Program in the School of Business, and the Annenberg Honors Program in the School of Communications.

Martha and Bruce Karsh STEM Scholars Program
In 2017, Howard established the Bison STEM Scholars Program to increase the number of underrepresented minorities with high-level research careers in science, engineering, technology, and mathematics. Bison STEM Scholars are given full scholarships and committed to earning a PhD or a combined MD–PhD in a STEM discipline. The highly competitive program annually accepts approximately 30 undergraduate students for each new cohort. As of 2020, the Bison STEM Scholars Program was renamed the Martha and Bruce Karsh Stem Scholars Program (KSSP) following the $10 million donation from the family's foundation.

Google's Tech Exchange
In 2017, Google Inc. announced it established a pilot residency program named "Howard University West" on its campus in Mountain View, California, to help increase underrepresented minorities in the tech industry. In 2018, the program expanded from a three-month summer program to a full academic year program and the name changed to "Tech Exchange" to be inclusive of 15 other minority-serving institutions added to the program such as Florida A&M, Prairie View A&M, and Fisk. Howard students in the program learn from senior Google engineers, practice the latest coding techniques, and experience tech culture in Mountain View for course credits towards their degrees.

Disney Storyteller Fund
In July 2022, the Walt Disney Company announced it established the Disney Storytellers Fund at the Cathy Hughes School of Communications and the Chadwick A. Boseman College of Fine Arts to support creative student projects.  The fund provides undergraduate students with stipends up to $60,000 and mentorship intended to help cultivate a new generation of Black storytellers. In October 2022, the fund expanded to other HBCU campuses.

Research

Interdisciplinary Research Building
Howard's most prominent research building is the Interdisciplinary Research Building (IRB). Opened in 2016, the multi-story, 81,670 square foot, state-of-the-art research facility was completed for $70 million. The IRB was designed to promote more collaborative and innovative research on campus.

Moorland-Spingarn Research Center

"The Moorland-Spingarn Research Center (MSRC) is recognized as one of the world's largest and most comprehensive repositories for the documentation of the history and culture of people of African descent in Africa, the Americas, and other parts of the world. The MSRC collects, preserves, and makes available for research a wide range of resources chronicling black experiences."

NASA University Research Center (BCCSO)
The Beltsville Center for Climate System Observation (BCCSO) is a NASA University Research Center at the Beltsville, Maryland campus of Howard University. BCCSO consists of a multidisciplinary group of Howard faculty in partnership with NASA Goddard Space Flight Center Earth Sciences Division, other academic institutions, and government. This group is led by three Principal Investigators, Everette Joseph, also the director of BCCSO, Demetrius Venable and Belay Demoz. BCCSO trains science and academic leaders to understand atmospheric processes through atmospheric observing systems and analytical methods.

Publications
Howard University is home to The Hilltop, the university's student newspaper. Founded in 1924 by Zora Neale Hurston, The Hilltop enjoys a long legacy at the university.

Howard University is the publisher of The Journal of Negro Education, which began publication in 1932. The Howard University Bison Yearbook is created, edited and published during the school year to provide students a year-in-review. Howard University also publishes the Capstone, the official e-newsletter for the university; and the Howard Magazine, the official magazine for the university, which is published three times a year.

Howard University Libraries

Howard University Libraries (HUL) is the library system of Howard University and is composed by eight branches and centers:
 The Founders Library, the main library, founded in January 1939.
 The School of Business Library
 The School of Divinity Library
 The School of Social Work Library
 The Moorland-Spingarn Research Center
 The Channing Pollock Theatre Collection
 The Patent and Trademark Resource Center
 The Undergraduate Library (UGL).
 Afro-American Studies Center

Student life

Athletics

Most of Howard's 21 NCAA Division I varsity teams compete primarily in the Mid-Eastern Athletic Conference (MEAC).

Students

The U.S. students come from the following regions: New England 2%, Mid-West 8%, South 22%, Mid-Atlantic 55%, and West 12%. Nearly 4% of the student body are international students. Howard University is 86% African-American/Black.

Howard is one of the five largest HBCUs in the nation with around 10,000 students. The student-to-faculty ratio is 7:1.

Howard is a selective institution. The incoming freshman class of fall 2021 had 29,391 applicants and 10,362 (35%) were accepted into Howard.

There are over 200 student organizations and special interest groups established on campus.

Howard produced four Rhodes Scholars between 1986 and 2017. Between 1998 and 2009, Howard University produced a Marshall Scholar, two Truman Scholars, twenty-two Fulbright Scholars and ten Pickering Fellows.

In 2020, 82% of first-year students received need-based financial aid.

Greek letter organizations

Howard University is the founding site of the National Pan-Hellenic Council (NPHC) and five of the nine NPHC organizations. The Alpha (founding) Chapters of Alpha Kappa Alpha (1908), Omega Psi Phi (1911), Delta Sigma Theta (1913), Phi Beta Sigma (1914), and Zeta Phi Beta (1920) were established on Howard's campus. However, the Beta Chapter of Alpha Phi Alpha was the first to appear in 1907. Also in 1920, the Xi Chapter of Kappa Alpha Psi appeared on campus, followed by the Alpha Phi Chapter of Sigma Gamma Rho in 1939, and the Alpha Tau Chapter of Iota Phi Theta in 1983. Three percent of undergraduate men and five percent of undergraduate women are active in Howard's NPHC.

Other notable Greek letter organizations registered at Howard include Phi Beta Kappa, Iota Phi Lambda, Tau Beta Pi, Delta Sigma Pi, Phi Sigma Pi, Alpha Phi Omega, Alpha Nu Omega, Alpha Kappa Psi, Phi Sigma Rho, Gamma Iota Sigma, Phi Mu Alpha, Sigma Alpha Iota, Gamma Sigma Sigma, Kappa Kappa Psi, Tau Beta Sigma, Chi Eta Phi, and Phi Alpha Delta.

Howard Homecoming
Howard Homecoming week is the most prominent and richest cultural tradition of the institution. Over 100,000 of alumni, students, celebrity guests, and visitors are in attendance to patronize the many events and attractions affiliated with the festive week on and near campus. While the specific calendar of events changes from year to year, the traditional homecoming events include the Homecoming Football Game and Tailgate, Pep Rally, Coronation Ball, Greek Step-Show (Howard NPHC Greeks), and Fashion Show. After a two-year hiatus, the Yardfest returned in 2016 as one of the cherished traditions.

Howard's first official homecoming was held in 1924 and it takes place every fall semester with a new theme developed by the homecoming committee.

Springfest
Springfest is an annual tradition created by the Undergraduate Student Association (UGSA) to celebrate the arrival of spring. Springfest is similar to homecoming week in the fall but on a smaller scale and with more emphasis on the student body. Springfest events traditionally include the Fashion Show, Talent Show, Vendor Fair, Poetry Showcase, Beauty Conference, Charity Basketball Game, and a major community service event. The schedule of events changes slightly each year.

Bison Ball
The Bison Ball and Excellence Awards is an annual black tie gala hosted by the Howard University Student Association (HUSA). A select number of students, faculty, organizations, and administrators from the Howard community are honored for their exceptional accomplishments. This event takes place near the end of every spring semester.

Resfest
Resfest week is a Howard tradition that involves freshmen living in residence halls on campus and competing in several organized competitions (field day, academic debate, stroll, step-show etc) for campus bragging rights. This event takes place on campus near the end of every spring semester.

Notable alumni

Distinguished alumni of Howard University include a Vice President of the United States, several United States diplomats and United States governors, a United States Ambassador to the United Nations, foreign royals, seven foreign heads of state, 11 members of United States Congress, a Supreme Court Justice, directors and executives of Fortune 500 companies, Academy Award– and Emmy Award–winning actors, Grammy Award—winning songwriters and producers, two US Army generals, a US Air Force general and Vice Chief of Staff of the United States Air Force, and Nobel laureates including Nobel Prize for Literature winner Toni Morrison. Additional alumni include civil rights activists and pioneers in the Civil Rights Movement, a United States Secretary of Health and Human Services, a United States Secretary of Housing and Urban Development, a United States Secretary of Agriculture, 12 Mayors of American cities, and three State Attorneys General. Howard University has also produced many firsts, including Roger Arliner Young who became the first African-American woman to receive a doctorate in zoology, Benjamin O. Davis Sr. the first African-American US Army general, Johnson O. Akinleye, 12th Chancellor of North Carolina Central University,
Thurgood Marshall, the first African-American Supreme Court justice, and Edward W. Brooke III who became the first African-American elected to the US Senate, among others. Howard University also counts four Rhodes Scholarship winners, 22 Pickering Fellows, 11 Truman Scholars, over 70 Fulbright Scholars, a Schwarzman Scholar, a Goldwater Scholar, and two Pulitzer Prize winners and numerous other Pulitzer Prize nominees among its alumni. To date Howard University has granted over 120,000 degrees and produces the most black doctorate recipients of any university.

See also
 A Bridge Across and Beyond by artist Richard Hunt (a sculpture at the Blackburn Fountain)
 Howard Theatre
 List of presidents of Howard University

References

External links

 
 Howard Athletics website
 

 
1867 establishments in Washington, D.C.
African-American history of Washington, D.C.
American Missionary Association
Educational institutions established in 1867
Historically black universities and colleges in the United States
Private universities and colleges in Washington, D.C.